Hubert Alton George "Huey" Whittaker (born June 19, 1981) is an American football wide receiver who is currently a free agent. He was signed by the Pittsburgh Steelers as an undrafted free agent in 2004. He played college football at South Florida.

He has also been a member of the Jacksonville Jaguars, Tampa Bay Buccaneers, Tampa Bay Storm, Utah Blaze, New York Jets and Spokane Shock.

Early life
Whittaker attended Frank W. Springstead High School in Spring Hill, Florida, where he was named a St. Petersburg Times All-Suncoast selection as a senior with 10 receiving touchdowns.

College career
Whittaker attended Hudson Valley Community College before transferring to the University of South Florida.

Professional career

New York Jets
Whittaker was signed to a future contract by the New York Jets on January 2, 2009. He was waived on August 12 when the team signed placekicker Parker Douglass. He was re-signed on August 16 only to be waived again on August 30.

Spokane Shock
Whittaker was a starting wide receiver for the Spokane Shock in 2010.

Florida Tuskers
Whittaker was signed by the Florida Tuskers of the United Football League on August 26, 2010.

References

1981 births
Living people
Players of American football from Florida
American football wide receivers
South Florida Bulls football players
Pittsburgh Steelers players
Tampa Bay Buccaneers players
Jacksonville Jaguars players
Frankfurt Galaxy players
Tampa Bay Storm players
Utah Blaze players
New York Jets players
Spokane Shock players
Florida Tuskers players
San Jose SaberCats players
Hudson Valley Vikings football players
People from Spring Hill, Florida